Memecylon cinereum is a species of plant in the family Melastomataceae. It is found in Malaysia and Singapore. It is threatened by habitat loss.

References

cinereum
Vulnerable plants
Taxonomy articles created by Polbot